Sebastian Bauza (Montevideo, 17 May 1961), is a Uruguayan dentist, sports leader, businessman and politician of the National Party (PN) serving as Secretary of Sports of Uruguay since March 1, 2020.

Family and education 
He is the son of Sebastián Bauzá Ques. Graduated University of the Republic, he has a Dentistry degree. He is also a restaurateur in a family business and is owner and manager of confectionery Lion D'Or.

Career

Sports 
He presided over the Club Atlético Bella Vista like his father who led the club for 27 years. He was president of the Uruguayan Football Association from 2009 to 2014. In 2015, he declared in court with all the members of the South American Football Confederation for the Case FIFA. However, in 2017 his case is archived.

Politics 
He ran in the 2015 Montevideo municipal election as deputy to Edgardo Novick and Álvaro Garcé. He was appointed Secretary of Sports in December 2019, after the victory of Luis Lacalle Pou as President of Uruguay. He took office on March 1, 2020.

References 

1961 births
Uruguayan businesspeople
People from Montevideo
University of the Republic (Uruguay) alumni
Uruguayan politicians
Living people
Uruguayan dentists
Presidents of the Uruguayan Football Association